Venice Grand Canal is a lifestyle mall development under Megaworld Lifestyle Malls located inside the  McKinley Hill township of Megaworld Corporation in Taguig City.

Awarded the Best Retail Architectural Design at the Philippine Property Awards in 2017, Venice Grand Canal is known for its design and architecture and is popularly considered as the "most romantic mall" in the country.

Living up to its namesake, the mall sports an Italian-inspired architectural design inspired by the Grand Canal in the classical city of Venice, Italy. In designing the mall, Megaworld consulted the Rome-based architectural firm Paolo Marioni Architetto to ensure that the Venice Grand Canal Mall stays true to its Venetian inspiration.

Highlighting the mall is the man-made Grand Canal. The mall's grand canal offers mall guests an Italian experience with gondola ride tours by singing gondoliers. The gondolas are stationed underneath the Rialto Bridge replica.

The mall also has replicas of St. Mark's Campanile in Piazza San Marco, the Rialto Bridge, which is inspired by the famous bridge in Venice and the Ponte de Amore Bridge, where mallgoers can participate at the mall's love locks installation.

Features

Lifestyle Destination 
The mall also offers a diverse dining mix that caters to the McKinley Hill community and to the lifestyle of its mall patrons such as Italian restaurants Ponte Amore and Toni and Sergio, along with international options like Tim Hortons and Mitsuyado Sei-Men.

Venice Grand Canal is also home to an array of shopping brands, a supermarket, lifestyle stores, bookstore, services shops, novelty shops, and wellness and fitness centers. The country’s first Fundador Café, can also be found at the mall.

For animal lovers, Venice Grand Canal is pet-friendly mall, and hosts facilities and amenities tailored for pet owners through its Pet Pass system.

Venice Grand Canal is also a destination for entertainment. At the mall’s 3rd level is Venice Cineplex, which is equipped with Dolby Atmos, and a Megaworld Lifestyle Malls Ultra Cinema, which uses remote operated high end twin seats.

The mall also hosts regular events and activities that cater to all ages such as Venetian mimes, conciertos and the McKinley Hill Grand Christmas Parade.

Gondolas at Venice Grand Canal 
Venice Grand Canal’s Gondola Ride offers an Italian experience, giving families and couples a chance to tour the canal by water.

Venice Piazza 
Venice Piazza is an open space in Venice Grand Canal inspired by Piazza San Marco in Venice, Italy. Towering over the open plaza is a replica of St. Mark’s Tower, also in Piazza San Marco.  Aside from Italian-inspired attractions, Venice Piazza is another dining destination with its roster of international and local dining brands offering al-fresco and nightlife dining. The Piazza also offers Pigeon Feeding activities every late afternoon.

Gallery

See also 
 Grand Canal (Venice)
 Megaworld Lifestyle Malls
 Bonifacio Global City

References

External links 
 

Shopping malls in Taguig
Shopping malls established in 2015
2015 establishments in the Philippines